Mary Mary is a female American urban contemporary gospel duo composed of sisters Erica Atkins-Campbell (born April 29, 1972) and Trecina Atkins-Campbell (born May 1, 1974). Formed in 1998, Mary Mary was launched into mainstream recognition following the release of their best-selling debut album, Thankful (2000), which contained the hit single "Shackles (Praise You)". Their followup album Incredible (2002), reached number one on the Top Gospel Albums chart. Their self-titled third album, Mary Mary (2005), which contains themes the public interpreted as a channel to the group's experience, contains the worldwide hits "Heaven", "The Real Party", and "Yesterday".

Their fourth album The Sound (2008) spawned the number-one singles "Get Up" and "God in Me". In 2011, they released their fifth studio album "Something Big" and followed up with a compilation album "Go Get It" in 2012 before going on hiatus. In March 2012, they premiered their own television series, Mary Mary, on WE tv.

Mary Mary has sold more than eight million records worldwide to date. The duo have been nominated for eleven Grammy Awards, winning four times including once Best Gospel Performance and for Best Contemporary Soul Gospel Album. The duo are often credited for broadening the fan base of urban contemporary gospel in the 2000s by introducing elements of soul music, hip hop, funk and jazz. The group's name is inspired by two famous Marys from the Bible: Mary, mother of Jesus, and Mary Magdalene. They also performed at the White House in 2005.

Early years
The Atkins sisters, born Erica Monique and Trecina Evette, grew up in a large family with seven siblings in Inglewood, California. Their mother, Thomasina Atkins, is an evangelist and choir director at the Church of God in Christ. Their father, Eddie A. Atkins, was also a member of the Church of God in Christ, and a youth counselor, before he died in 2013.

Due to their proximity in age, the two sisters grew up closer to one another than to any of their siblings: Darrell Atkins (born 1965, the only living boy- the second boy died as a child), Maliea Atkins (born 1967), Erica (born 1972), Tina (born 1974), Delisa Atkins-Brown (born 1977), Thomasina Atkins (born 1978), Alana Atkins-Jamison (born 1985), and Shanta Atkins (born 1986). Later, they would work creatively with over half of their siblings; Thomasina, Alana, Delisa and Shanta Atkins all sing background on Mary Mary's albums and during stage performances and Delisa was originally a member of the group but left before they started recording professionally due to pursuing college. Eventually, all eight Atkins children united on the Bobby Jones Gospel show on BET.

During this time, Erica and Trecina entered the world of church choirs, traveling gospel shows, and television productions. The sisters enrolled at El Camino College to study voice. There they encountered the division between rigorous academic study of music versus the popular musical world. "We had to study classical and sing arias, which was fine," Erica told Times, "but the teachers would tell us if we sang anything else it would damage our instrument." In 1995 the two toured with Michael Matthews' traveling gospel shows, Mama I'm Sorry and Sneaky. Each sister subsequently toured as a backup singer for a variety of R&B acts, including Brandy.

Career

1999–2001: Thankful

After meeting producer Warryn Campbell, a publishing deal was reached with music conglomerate EMI. This led to a series of their songs being on movie soundtracks; they wrote "Dance" and performed it with Robin S. for the soundtrack to the 1998 film Dr. Dolittle, they performed "Let Go, Let God" for  The Prince of Egypt, and several of their songs were recorded by 702. However, the sister's profile really started to rise in the gospel industry when their songs "Time To Change" and "Yeah" were recorded by Yolanda Adams on Mountain High... Valley Low. During this time, Mary Mary as a musical entity formed.

The duo was subsequently signed to Columbia Records and decided to perform under the name Mary Mary, honoring Mary, the mother of Jesus, and Mary Magdalene. They were the first gospel act to record for the industry giant Columbia Records since Tramaine Hawkins in the mid-1990s. Their first single "Shackles (Praise You)" became a crossover hit; enticing gospel, R&B, and pop audiences. It ranked Top 5 in R&B, Top 10 for pop hit, and peaked at number 28 on the Billboard Hot 100 chart. It became the first gospel song in five years to crack the R&B top ten and gained wide exposure on MTV. Their debut album Thankful was released in May 2000; it peaked at number one on the Gospel Album Chart and climbed to 59 on the overall Top 200 chart. Overall, the album was certified Platinum for shipments of one million copies in the United States, it went on to win the Grammy Award for Best Contemporary Soul Gospel Album. While the second single "I Sings" features rapper BB Jay, both were hits in the UK and Europe. Their only Top 10 UK hit to date is "Shackles (Praise You)" which reached number five on the UK Singles Chart in June 2000. The follow-up "I Sings" peaked at UK number 32.

2002: Incredible

With their second album, Incredible, the duo was able to maintain their success. Soon after its release in July 2002, it was number one on the Gospel Albums Chart and entered the Top 20 of the Top 200 album chart. Incredible was later certified Gold for selling 500,000 copies in the United States. The album's singles were "In The Morning" and "I Try". While this album charted higher than their debut, sales were lower. The duo attributed the lower sales to less aggressive promotion due to label switch-overs and the advent of music piracy. In November 2003, they released their biography Transparent.

2005–06: Mary Mary and A Mary Mary Christmas

After taking time off to have children, Mary Mary released their self-titled third album Mary Mary in July 2005. It became the duo's first album to enter the Top 10 on Billboard and was later certified Gold for selling in excess of 500,000 copies. The first single, "Heaven," contained a sample from seventies song "Want Ads" from soul trio the Honey Cone's. "Heaven" made history and broke chart records as it had an unprecedented nine-week run at number one on Billboard's Gospel Radio Chart. Their second single, "The Real Party (Trevon's Birthday)," debuted at number 43 on the Gospel Radio Chart with a third, "Yesterday," becoming a hit on the Adult R&B Chart and peaking at number 10. On the R&B/Hip Hop Chart, the song became their second biggest hit since "Shackles (Praise You)" in 2000 reached number 50. The album's final single, "Believer," indicated testimonies of being a Christian and hit number 33 on the Gospel Radio chart.

2007–10: Sunday Best and The Sound

From 2007 to 2012, the Campbells both served as judges alongside Donnie McClurkin for a gospel music competition show on BET called Sunday Best.

On October 21, 2008, they released their fifth studio album, The Sound. The lead single, "Get Up," was released digitally via ITunes on July 15, 2008. Mary Mary's The Sound achieved great success in the mainstream market and sold over 37,000 copies in its first week, making it their best charting album to date. It debuted at number seven on the Billboard 200, number two on the US R&B chart, and topped both gospel and country music charts. The album held the number one position on the Billboard's Gospel Album Chart for over six months since its release. Warryn Campbell produced the album and collaborated with many professionals: Kierra Sheard, David Banner, Marvin Winans, Daryl Coley, Andrae Crouch, The Rance Allen Group, Dorinda Clark Cole, Joe Ligon, Walter Hawkins, Tramaine Hawkins, and Karen Clark Sheard. In spring 2009, "God in Me" achieved crossover success by reaching number five on the R&B/Hip-Hop Chart and number one on the Hot Dance Club Play.

The duo, along with Warryn Campbell, were nominated at the 52nd Grammy Awards in the Best Gospel Song category for "God in Me", that same year Israel Houghton's song they were featured on, named "Every Prayer", was also nominated. The album won Mary Mary four Stellar Awards on January 16, 2010. They were invited to participate in the remake of "We Are the World" to benefit Haiti after the earthquake.

2010–12: Something Big, Go Get It, and reality show
In 2009, Mary Mary began recording their sixth studio album. In April 2010, they released a book entitled, Be U via Simon & Schuster. In the fall of 2010, they released "Walking" as the lead single from their forthcoming album. Originally titled OMG, the project was renamed Something Big after the success of R&B singer Usher's hit single, "OMG" in 2010. Their album was released on March 29, 2011. Mary Mary debuted the title track "Something Big" on the BET's Celebration of Gospel 2011.

On February 13, 2012, Mary Mary debuted their new single, "Go Get It", from the greatest hits compilation album of the same title, at the Orpheum Theater in Los Angeles, California. The performance was shown on the season finale of their reality TV series, Mary Mary. The album was officially released on May 8, 2012. It featured 13 remixed and remastered hits from their previous albums.

In efforts of promoting "Go Get It," Mary Mary announced a Go Get It Tour. The tour was in ten different cities across the United States, beginning in Jacksonville, Florida on October 25, and ending in Hampton, Virginia on November 17. Supported acts included: Isaac Carree, VaShawn Mitchell, Anthony and Group Therapy, and Sunday's Best  finalist Jessica Reedy and Anita Wilson.

2014–present: Group hiatus and solo projects
In 2014, Erica Campbell released a solo album titled Help, which won Best Gospel Album at the 57th Annual Grammy Awards. Her follow-up album titled Help 2.0 was released in March 2015. Erica also hosts a morning radio show, Get Up! Mornings with Erica Campbell owned by Radio One with comedian Arlen "Griff" Griffin. In May 2015, Tina released her debut solo album It's Personal. The album coincides with the release of her memoir I Need a Day to Pray.

In July 2016, Mary Mary released a new single called "Back to You" from the upcoming Ben-Hur movie soundtrack. In August 2017, Tina released a deluxe edition of her first album, titled It's Still Personal. In 2018 Mary Mary made their reunion as a duo on the 2018 Stellar Awards on TV One, performing a medley of their hits.

Erica Campbell and husband announced their upcoming series premiering on TVOne. This announcement came on the heels of Mary Mary ending their WeTv reality show.

MaryMary, accompanied by the Youth Orchestra of Los Angeles, performed "Lift Every Voice and Sing" at Super Bowl LVI and had a tribute to honor Black History Month gospel music 2022 by Faith City Music, Tim Bowman Jr. and Kim Burrell.

Mary Mary performed at a special Easter Verzuz in 2022, competing against gospel duo BeBe & CeCe Winans.

In 2022 Mary Mary featured on Tasha Cobbs Leonard 2022 album Hymns (Live). Later that year they performed "Biggest, Greatest Thing" with Adam Blackstone on The Tonight Show Starring Jimmy Fallon.

Personal life
Both sisters are married to cousin's which is why they both have the same last name  Campbell. In 2000, Tina married Teddy Campbell, who was the drummer for American Idol. He has a daughter, Cierra, from a previous relationship. Together, they have four other children: daughter Laiah Simone (born September 9, 2003), daughter Meela Jane (born June 11, 2007), son Glendon Theodore II (born October 20, 2009), and son Santana (born August 4, 2012).

Erica married their record producer Warryn Campbell on May 26, 2001. Their wedding was documented on TLC's A Wedding Story. They have three children: Krista Nicole (born September 13, 2004), Warryn III (born April 24, 2010), and Zaya Monique (born January 24, 2012).

In 2014, Warryn and Erica Campbell started a local Bible study program in Los Angeles, California.

The following year, Warryn was ordained as a pastor. In 2015, the couple founded the California Worship Center, which meets in North Hollywood, Los Angeles.

Discography

Thankful (2000)
Incredible (2002)
Mary Mary (2005)
A Mary Mary Christmas (2006)
The Sound (2008)
Something Big (2011)

See also

References

External links
 

 
African-American girl groups
American contemporary R&B musical groups
American gospel musical groups
American musical duos
Contemporary R&B duos
Christian contemporary R&B groups
Female musical duos
Grammy Award winners
Musical groups established in 1998
Musical groups from California
Sibling musical duos
Urban contemporary gospel musicians
1998 establishments in California